Nipmuc Regional High School is a public high school in Upton, Massachusetts, United States, part of the Mendon-Upton Regional School District.

Nipmuc Regional High School is located on a fifty-acre wooded lot in Upton, Massachusetts, in the Blackstone Valley region of the state. It serves the towns of Mendon and Upton through a cooperative arrangement established in 1961. In addition to Nipmuc Regional, there are three other schools in the Mendon-Upton Regional School District: Miscoe Hill Middle School, Clough Elementary School (Mendon,) and Memorial Elementary School (Upton.) The year-round population of the two towns is respectively 5,876 and 7,640.

Sports 
NIpmuc Regional High School sports include mixed cheer leading, cross country, football, Golf (men), soccer, field hockey, baseball, volleyball, lacrosse, track (indoor/outdoor), hockey, basketball, wrestling and swimming. They are in the Dual Valley Conference (a conference made up entirely of division 5 schools, with the exception of Nipmuc) and their sports range from division 1 to division 4. The boys' soccer team won the Division 3 State Championship in 2017.

Demographics 
Nipmuc population by grade is 9th-153, 10th-133, 11th-177, 12th-166. The ethnicity rate is 2% Asian, 1% Black, 2% Hispanic, 94% White. The sex distribution is 51% female and 49% male. The free lunch rate in the school is 11%, and the reduced lunch rate in 2%. The student to teacher ratio in the school is 13:1

Advanced Placement 
The participation rate for Nipmuc is 63%

Notable alumni and faculty 
Rachel Bloznalis: alumna; soccer player who plays for Djurgårdens IF in the Swedish Damallsvenskan
Kevin Gilmartin; former head football coach at Nipmuc
Tom Grant: alumnus; Chicago Cubs Major League Baseball player, alumnus

See also 

 List of high schools in Massachusetts

References

Public high schools in Massachusetts
Schools in Worcester County, Massachusetts
1960 establishments in Massachusetts